19 May 1956 Stadium, Stade du 19-mai-1956, or simply May 19th Stadium is a football stadium located in Annaba, Algeria.The stadium has a capacity of 52,000 and is all-seated. It is currently used on a regular basis by football club USM Annaba who play in the Algerian Ligue Professionnelle 2. It is also occasionally used by the Algeria national football team.

History
On June 10, 1987, the stadium was inaugurated with a match between the Algerian national football team and Sudan. Sudanese international Kamel Mohammed was the first person to score in the stadium, scoring in the 15th minute of the game. The first Algerian to score in the stadium was Djamel Menad, who scored in the 85th minute of the same game. Algeria won the game 3–1. The stadium hosted several matches during the 1990 African Cup of Nations.

The most recent game played there was Algeria's 1–0 win over Morocco during the 2012 African Cup of Nations Qualification, with the only goal being scored by Hassan Yebda from the penalty spot. It was the only victory during Benchika's reign as the Algerian manager, and it was done before a sell-out crowd.

On March 5, 2012, Mohamed Raouraoua, the president of the FAF in Algeria, stated that the stadium might become the official stadium for the CAF U-20 tournament which will be played in Algeria.

Tenants and events

2022 African Nations Championship
the stadium was one of four stadiums that have been appointed to host the 2022 African Nations Championship,  it hosted 5 games in Group B and one game in Group A and one game in the quarter-finals, this was the first major international competition that this stadium hosted since the 1990 African Cup of Nations.

See also

List of football stadiums in Algeria
List of African stadiums by capacity
List of association football stadiums by capacity

References

19 Mai
Buildings and structures in Annaba